Malhador is a municipality located in the Brazilian state of Sergipe. It is a little city in a rural area. It is located near Itabaiana. Its population was 12,653 (2020) and its area is 101 km².

The municipality contains part of the Serra de Itabaiana National Park.

References

Municipalities in Sergipe